KU Hydrae is a binary star in the constellation Hydra. The primary star is an Alpha2 Canum Venaticorum variable with its apparent magnitude varying from 0.05 magnitudes over a period of 33.97 days.

This star was discovered to be a visual binary star by Robert Grant Aitken in 1906 and was given the double star designation A 1342. Additional measurements of the position angle and angular separation showed a rapid orbital motion.

References

Hydra (constellation)
081009
3724
Hydrae, KU
Durchmusterung objects
045999
Binary stars
Alpha2 Canum Venaticorum variables